Postcards Records was an American jazz record company and label founded in 1993 by Ralph Simon and Sybil Golden. Through 1997 its catalogue included music by Paul Bley, Bill Frisell, Julian Priester, Gary Peacock, Sam Rivers, and Reggie Workman. In 1999, Arkadia Records bought Postcards, producing new recordings and reissuing the back catalog.

Discography

References

American record labels
Jazz record labels